Jonathan Boareto dos Reis (born 20 April 1989), known as just Jonathan Balotelli, is a Brazilian footballer who plays as a centre forward at Malaysia Super League club Kedah Darul Aman.

References

1989 births
Living people
Campeonato Brasileiro Série B players
Campeonato Brasileiro Série C players
Macedonian First Football League players
K League 1 players
Persian Gulf Pro League players
China League One players
Friburguense Atlético Clube players
Sport Club do Recife players
Audax Rio de Janeiro Esporte Clube players
Macaé Esporte Futebol Clube players
União Recreativa dos Trabalhadores players
Cuiabá Esporte Clube players
FK Vardar players
Busan IPark players
Sanat Naft Abadan F.C. players
Al-Gharafa SC players
Sichuan Longfor F.C. players
Kedah Darul Aman F.C. players
Expatriate footballers in North Macedonia
Brazilian expatriate sportspeople in North Macedonia
Expatriate footballers in Qatar
Brazilian expatriate sportspeople in Qatar
Expatriate footballers in South Korea
Brazilian expatriate sportspeople in South Korea
Expatriate footballers in Iran
Brazilian expatriate sportspeople in Iran
Expatriate footballers in China
Brazilian expatriate sportspeople in China
Association football forwards
Footballers from Rio de Janeiro (city)
Brazilian footballers